Jugoslav Dobričanin, M.A. (born March 9, 1956, near Kuršumlija) is Serbian politician. He is the vice-president of the Reformist Party. Jugoslav Dobričanin was running for a president on 2008 Serbian presidential election. He won only 0.29% of votes. He is a military historian.

External links
Biography

1956 births
Living people
Reformist Party (Serbia) politicians
Candidates for President of Serbia
21st-century Serbian politicians